How Moscha Came Back is a 1914 silent film comedy short directed by Phillips Smalley. It was produced by the Crystal Film Company and distributed through Universal Film Manufacturing Company.

The film survives in the Library of Congress collection.

References

External links
 How Moscha Came Back at IMDb.com

1914 films
American silent short films
Universal Pictures short films
Films directed by Phillips Smalley
American black-and-white films
Silent American comedy films
1914 comedy films
1910s American films
1910s English-language films
American comedy short films